Marvin Kleeb (born December 21, 1956) is a former Republican member of the Kansas House of Representatives, representing the 48th district from 2009 to 2017.  After re-election in 2016, he decided to retire and was replaced by Abraham Rafie.

Kleeb is a member of the Kansas National Federation of Independent Businesses State Council, Mid-America Personnel and Staffing Services, and the Overland Park Rotary.

Issue positions
Kleeb's website lists his legislative priorities as economic development, jobs growth and retention, education, fiscally responsible government and fair taxes, healthcare, a comprehensive and strategic energy plan, and seniors. In 2016, the American Conservative Union gave him a lifetime rating of 79%

Committee membership
 Taxation
 Transportation
 Judiciary

Major Donors
The top 5 donors to Kleeb's 2008 campaign:
1. Tall T Enterprises Inc 	$1,000
2. Kansas Chamber of Commerce 	$500 	
3. Home Builders Assoc of Greater Kansas City 	$500
4. Hartman, Jill 	$500 	
5. Kansas Medical Society 	$500

References

External links
 Official Website
 Kansas Legislature - Marvin Kleeb
 Project Vote Smart profile
 Kansas Votes profile
 Follow the Money campaign contributions:
 2008

Republican Party members of the Kansas House of Representatives
Living people
1956 births
21st-century American politicians